Drowned in Sound, sometimes abbreviated to DiS, is a UK-based music webzine financed by artist management company Silentway. Founded by editor Sean Adams, the site features reviews, news, interviews, and discussion forums.

History
DiS began as an email fanzine in 1998 called The Last Resort but was relaunched by founder and editor Sean Adams as Drowned in Sound in 2000.

The freelance writing team is currently spread across four continents – North America, Asia, Europe and Australasia. The site is mostly based on contributions from unpaid writers and has an integrated forum to allow for discussion and comments on interviews, news and reviews. It also includes a user-rated database of artists and bands as well as details for most live music venues (big and small) in the UK. The site has over 60,000 registered members, and gets around 470,000 unique visitors per month.

In 2006, the site launched a podcast called Drowned in Sound Radio.

In November 2007, DiS teamed up with ad-supported download site RCRDLBL.com to launch an audio and video blog, entitled "Drownload".

DiS has been involved with the Summer Sundae festival since 2008, and in 2010 kicked off their 10th anniversary celebrations with a line-up headlined by the Futureheads and Frightened Rabbit. Previously, they hosted the Friday night billing of the Rising Stage as being presented in partnership with Drowned in Sound.

In April 2019, Sean Adams posted on his personal Facebook page that the website will cease commissioning album reviews and features for the foreseeable future.

Ownership
A percentage of DrownedinSound.com (the website) and the Drowned in Sound Recordings record label are owned by Silentway Ltd.

DiS had a short-lived partnership with Rupert Murdoch's BSkyB, which ended by mutual consent in August 2008, resulting in the majority of staff being laid off.

Awards
On 19 March 2006, The Observers Music Monthly ranked DrownedinSound.com 9th on its list of top 25 websites. In November 2006, it passed the 150,000 unique readers a week mark and was nominated in the Best Music Website category at the 2007 PLUG Awards and the Best Website category at the 2007 Shockwaves NME Awards.

The site and a handful of its writers received nominations at the 2006 Record of the Day awards, held in London on 21 November 2006. The site won in the category of Best Podcast and finished runner-up in the category of Best Website for the second year running.

In September 2007, DiS was nominated in two categories at the annual BT Digital Music Awards for Best Music Magazine and Best Podcast (audio). In November 2007, DiS was named Best Online Music Publication at the annual Record of the Day awards. In 2010, Drowned in Sound won Best Publication at the Record of the Day awards.

References

External links

Internet properties established in 2000
Online music magazines published in the United Kingdom
British music websites
British review websites
British record labels
Music review websites